Antun Palić  (born 25 June 1988) is a Croatian footballer who plays as a midfielder.

Club career

NK Zagreb

A product of NK Zagreb academy, Palić, after turning professional in July 2007 was sent on loan to third division side NK Lučko where he spent his first senior season. At the end of 2007–08 season Palić returned to NK Zagreb just to be immediately released on free transfer in the summer transfer period, without ever appearing in a single official senior match for NK Zagreb. Release was never explained by Zagreb officials even though Palić was at the time on a wider list of Croatia national under-20 football team.

First Division Clubs

In July 2008 Palić went on to join NK Croatia Sesvete signing his first professional contract. In a season and half long stay at Croatia Sesvete he made 31 league appearances, adding two more in Croatian Cup competition. He scored only three league goals of which one was particularly valuable, achieved against major Croatian team Hajduk Split on 5 October 2008 at Kranjčevićeva. An early opening goal in the end proved to be the only and crucial one in 1–0 win, resulting in first-ever club victory over Hajduk. In December 2009 club management made a strange move at the time, placing him on transfer list for opening winter transfer window. Especially surprising was timing of decision from the club as Palić was in process of recovery from an injury and was a regular member of Croatia national under-21 football team. Reason was proved later on to be due to the major financial trouble club was going on, finally leading to dissolving the club in 2012 due to financial irregularities. Croatia Sesvete continued to write off players. At the end Palić terminated contract with Croatia on mutual agreement together with his teammates Marijo Jurin and Matija Katanec.

Palić moved to NK Inter Zaprešić in January 2010. After a year in Zaprešić, Palić was signed by Dinamo Zagreb on a 4.5-year contract, but got few chances to play for the club in his first year at the club, and signed for the Cypriot side AEK Larnaca F.C.

International career

Internationally, Palić represented Croatia at under-19, under-20 and Croatia under-21 team.

Honours

Club
Dinamo Zagreb
Croatian First League: 2010–11
Croatian Cup: 2010–11
Dinamo București
Cupa Ligii: 2016–17
Sheriff Tiraspol
Moldovan National Division: 2018

References

External links
 

1988 births
Living people
Footballers from Zagreb
Association football midfielders
Croatian footballers
Croatia youth international footballers
Croatia under-21 international footballers
NK Lučko players
NK Croatia Sesvete players
NK Inter Zaprešić players
GNK Dinamo Zagreb players
AEK Larnaca FC players
Antun Palic
NK Krka players
FC Dinamo București players
Royal Excel Mouscron players
FC Sheriff Tiraspol players
Kaposvári Rákóczi FC players
FC Argeș Pitești players
Croatian Football League players
Cypriot First Division players
Antun Palic
Slovenian PrvaLiga players
Liga I players
Moldovan Super Liga players
Nemzeti Bajnokság I players
Croatian expatriate footballers
Expatriate footballers in Cyprus
Croatian expatriate sportspeople in Cyprus
Expatriate footballers in Thailand
Croatian expatriate sportspeople in Thailand
Expatriate footballers in Slovenia
Croatian expatriate sportspeople in Slovenia
Expatriate footballers in Romania
Croatian expatriate sportspeople in Romania
Expatriate footballers in Moldova
Croatian expatriate sportspeople in Moldova
Expatriate footballers in Hungary
Croatian expatriate sportspeople in Hungary